Ikimizi can refer to:

Nandi bear
Marozi